Events from the year 1765 in Sweden

Incumbents
 Monarch – Adolf Frederick

Events

 
 - Sweden forms an alliance with Russia and Denmark-Norway. 
 
 
 
 October -  A new government is formed by the Caps (party) with support from bribes from the Russian Empire and England, with the French spending more than two and a half million Swedish crowns to uphold the status quo held by the Hats. It was the first Caps government since 1738. 
 - The Anna Ekelöf case.

Births

 
 
 
 - Julie Eckerman, courtesan and spy  (died 1800) 
 - Sofia Liljegren, opera singer  (died 1795) 
 10 January - Adolph Ribbing, count and politician. He participated in the regicide of Gustav III of Sweden in 1792  (died 1843)
 10 June - Metta Fock, convicted murderer  (died 1810)

Deaths

 
 1 August - Ulla Adlerfelt, painter  (born 1736) 
 - Samuel Klingenstierna, mathematician and scientist  (born 1698)

References

 
Years of the 18th century in Sweden
Sweden